D404 is a state road connecting A7 motorway Draga interchange to the eastern part of the city of Rijeka, and to the Port of Rijeka, Brajdica container cargo terminal. The road opening had a number of delays, even though associated construction works were virtually complete for a long time. In the meantime, the road was used as a parking space. Finally, on May 30, 2011, the D404 road was open to traffic considerably enhancing access to Brajdica and eastern parts of Rijeka. Approximately two thirds of the road are classified as an expressway with 3 lanes, although the section between Vežica and Draga interchanges has 4 lanes.

A connection to Rijeka Tower Centre is also provided from the road (northbound only), from within Pećine Tunnel.

The road, as well as all other state roads in Croatia, is managed and maintained by Hrvatske ceste, state owned company.

Road junctions and populated areas

Sources

See also
 Autocesta Rijeka - Zagreb

External links
 D404 Motorways-exits

State roads in Croatia
Transport in Primorje-Gorski Kotar County